The Wormwood Scrubs Act 1879 is a British public act passed by Parliament to lay down the conditions under which Wormwood Scrubs in west London was to be owned by the British Army. It is a local Act of Parliament.

135 acres of land known as Wormwood Scrubs was bought by the War Office (now the Ministry of Defence) in 1879 to "create a metropolitan exercising ground in pursuance of the Military Forces Localisation Act 1872"  The purchase was designed to ensure that a sufficiently large area of land was usable for military training close to the centre of the expanding London metropolis.

Despite military ownership which continues to this day, in the 1879 Act Parliament placed the new public-owned land of Wormwood Scrubs in the care of the Metropolitan Board of Works to ensure that alongside military training, the land could be given over to "the perpetual use thereof by the inhabitants of the metropolis for exercise and recreation".  This gave the Board of Works and its successors the ability to maintain and improve the land, although any such scheme must be referred to the War Office or its successors for approval. If approval can not be agreed, then there is a mechanism in the Act to allow both parties to appoint adjudicators and for any such decision to be umpired. It also prevents the Army from building any "permanent erections" other than rifle butts and "their related appurtenances".

The Act gives rights and authority to the public, the Army and the Metropolitan Board of Works and its successors.  The public's right to enjoy Wormwood Scrubs is protected in perpetuity - it may not be taken back wholesale by the military or sold unless the area "ceases to be used by the citizens of London".  In the same vein, the Act bans military training on public holidays.  The Metropolitan Board of Works was given the authority to pass by-laws over the area, while the Army can prohibit entry by civilians on pain of fines or imprisonment during periods of military training.

The Act remains in force today.  The successor body to the Metropolitan Board of Works in acting as civilian trustees of Wormwood Scrubs are the London Borough of Hammersmith and Fulham.  The Ministry of Defence has replaced the War Office.

The Act was appended by a Memorandum of  Understanding between the Ministry of Defence and the Greater London Council on 1 October 1980.  This sets out which party has responsibility for carrying out and paying for improvements to the land under certain circumstances.  In 2005, the government made clear that the Act is still adhered to by all parties, and that the military does still use the area for training.

Copies of the Act can be found at the Parliamentary Archives and Guildhall Library

References

1879 in British law
1879 in England
United Kingdom Acts of Parliament 1879
Penal system in England
Acts of the Parliament of the United Kingdom concerning London
London Borough of Hammersmith and Fulham